Canton is a historic waterfront neighborhood in Baltimore, Maryland, United States. The neighborhood is along Baltimore's outer harbor in the southeastern section of the city, roughly two miles east of Baltimore's downtown district and next to or near the neighborhoods of Patterson Park, Fell's Point, Highlandtown, and Brewers Hill.

Canton is considered one of Baltimore's trendiest and vibrant neighborhoods, known for its family-friendly community, urban lifestyle and hot spot for the social scene. The inclusive neighborhood continues to see rapid growth as more development opportunities come into the area. Since the late 1990s, the neighborhood has undergone significant gentrification and has been ranked the 16th most-gentrified zip code in the nation from 2000 to 2016.

History
In 1785, Irish merchant and slave owner, John O'Donnell settled in Baltimore after arriving on the ship "Pallas" from Calcutta and the Chinese port of Guangzhou, then called Canton by English speakers. When O'Donnell purchased land, he named his plantation Canton. In the beginning of the 19th century, O'Donnell's land was sold off by his son Columbus O’Donnell, William Patterson and Peter Cooper, and was developed by the Canton Company for the waterfront industry and blue-collar housing. On April 5th, 2021, after a successful campaign by neighborhood groups, O'Donnell's statue was removed. 

A major feature of early Canton was Major David Stodder's shipyard, located at Harris Creek, with the most famous vessel being built the USS Constellation.

During the early 19th century, European immigrants settled in the area. Welsh immigrants, primarily workers from South Wales, began settling in Baltimore in large numbers beginning in the 1820s. Welsh and Irish migrant workers composed a large portion of Baltimore's working class during the early and mid-1800s. In 1850, a large community of copper workers from Wales settled in the neighborhood. These workers established a Presbyterian church in 1865, located on Toone Street in Canton. Subsequent groups of immigrants have included Germans, Poles and Ukrainians.

In the 2000s, as industry moved out, new housing and marinas have been developed along the waterfront and gentrification of the existing housing has occurred further inland.

Boundaries
Canton is bounded by Patterson Park and Eastern Ave to the north, Chester Street to the west, the waterfront to the south, and Conkling Street to the east. The streets are laid out in a uniform north to south and east to west directions, with the major exception of Boston Street, which runs along the Patapsco River waterfront.

Transportation
Canton is conveniently situated with easy access to Interstate 95, Interstate 895 and Boston Street and Eastern Avenues, which provide major surface routes to downtown Baltimore. Two high-frequency MTA bus lines (Gold and Navy) service Canton for direct access to the central business district and Penn Station. The south waterfront area provides a water taxi link to Locust Point.

Bus transportation to New York City and Washington, D.C. is available with frequent service at a nearby Eastern Bus stop on Ponca Street.

Landmarks
Many of the structures are included in the Canton Historic District, listed on the National Register of Historic Places in 1980.

Canton's traditional center is O'Donnell Square, a small park bordered on the north and south by O'Donnell Street, to the east by South Potomac Street, and to the west by Linwood Avenue. O'Donnell Square is home to a number of lively bars and restaurants, gift shops, salons and other small businesses, as well as residences. Canton is also immediately adjacent to Patterson Park, a popular nearby attraction for local residents. In the 2000s, developments have added focus areas to the neighborhood, including the Canton Waterfront Park and Maryland Korean War Memorial, the rehabilitated American Can Company building, the Du Burns Soccer Arena, two marinas, a public boat launch, and new bars and restaurants. The Canton Dog Park, the first off-leash dog park in Baltimore, has been open for dog lovers since 2002.

The neighborhood is home to the many food and wine festivals, Light Night Canton, Baltimore's annual Ukrainian-American festival, summer concert series, and is a popular destination to view Baltimore Harbor July 4th fireworks. A premier shopping complex, The Shops at Canton Crossing, anchored by Target and Nordstrom Rack, has been serving local residents since 2013.

Notable churches in the area include the St. Casimir (Roman Catholic) Church, built c. 1926, the St. Michael the Archangel Ukrainian Catholic Church, and the (Episcopal) Church on the Square.

Canton's branch of the Enoch Pratt Free Library, Baltimore's first and in operation since 1866, is centrally located on O’Donnell Square.

A moored trash interceptor, the female-gendered Professor Trash Wheel (with appropriate googly eyes) can be found off the Boston Street Pier Park since December 2016.

Housing stock
Most houses in Canton are turn-of-the-20th-century two- to three-story rowhouses. Some homes closer to the waterfront date from the Civil War and many are well-preserved despite their age. New townhouses have recently been built at O'Donnell Square and throughout the neighborhood, replacing some of the previous stock. There are also luxury waterfront apartments and condominiums in recently rehabilitated industrial buildings. According to the Baltimore Neighborhood Indicators Alliance, the median price of homes sold in 2016 was $286,500, an increase from $231,000 in 2011.

Demographics
Based on data derived from the census of 2010 and 2014 ACS 5-year estimate, there were 11,398 people living in the neighborhood. The racial makeup of Canton was 90.8% White, 3.9% African American, 0.1% Native American, 2.3% Asian, 1.0% from other races, and 2.0% from two or more races. The median household income in 2016 was $103,282, the 2nd highest of all Baltimore neighborhoods, behind Roland Park. 88.1% of the working-age population is employed, 3.0% is unemployed, both rates highest and lowest, respectively, among all Baltimore neighborhoods.

References

External links

 The Canton Community Association
 , including photo from 2004, at Maryland Historical Trust
 Boundary Map of the Canton Historic District, Baltimore City

 
Gentrification in the United States
Neighborhoods in Baltimore
Historic districts on the National Register of Historic Places in Baltimore
Victorian architecture in Maryland
German-American culture in Baltimore
Irish-American culture in Baltimore
Polish-American culture in Baltimore
Welsh-American culture in Maryland
Maryland populated places on the Chesapeake Bay
Southeast Baltimore